Richard Heinrichs is an American production designer, effects artist, art director and film producer. He is well known for his work on the Pirates of the Caribbean series, Ang Lee's Hulk and The Nightmare Before Christmas. He started his career on visual effects on the other world sequence in The Watcher in the Woods, Tim Burton's Hansel and Gretel and Vincent to later work on Alfred Hitchcock Presents and Nutcracker: The Motion Picture. He also worked on Frankenweenie. He won an Academy Award for Best Art Direction (now called the Academy Award for Best Production Design) for Sleepy Hollow (1999) and received further nominations for Lemony Snicket's A Series of Unfortunate Events (2004) and Pirates of the Caribbean: Dead Man's Chest (2006).

He also contributed conceptional designs for Tim Burton's failed Superman Lives project.

Biography 
Graduated from the California Institute of the Arts (in Valencia, California), he started to work at Disney where he met Tim Burton and became a regular collaborator of his.

Filmography

External links

Year of birth missing (living people)
American production designers
Living people
American art directors
American film producers
California Institute of the Arts alumni
Best Art Direction Academy Award winners
Best Production Design BAFTA Award winners